The Lost Lake Guard Station in Okanogan–Wenatchee National Forest near Tonasket, Washington was built in 1940 by the Civilian Conservation Corps.  It was listed on the U.S. National Register of Historic Places on April 11, 1986.  It was designed by the USDA Forest Svce. Architecture Group of the Pacific Northwest region in Rustic architecture.  The listing included a  area.

It was deemed significant architecturally as an outstanding example of "the rustic architectural idiom developed by the Forest Service, Pacific Northwest Region, to impart Forest Service identity and to represent its purposes and ideal, and signifies the agency's particular interpretation of a singular expression of early twentieth century American architectural thought."

References

Civilian Conservation Corps in Washington (state)
United States Forest Service ranger stations
Park buildings and structures on the National Register of Historic Places in Washington (state)
Government buildings completed in 1940
Buildings and structures in Okanogan County, Washington
Rustic architecture in Washington (state)
National Register of Historic Places in Okanogan County, Washington